Rangpur is a town and one of the 51 union councils (administrative subdivisions) of Khushab District in the Punjab Province of Pakistan. The Union Council is part of the Noorpur Thal Tehsil. It is situated on Kaloorkot road to the south west of Khushab city.  The seepage of water from the Chashma link canal has spoiler cultivable land. Rangpur is the second biggest town in Noorpur Thal Tehsil after Noorpur Thal City.

The Greater Thal canal 
The history of Thal Project goes back to over 130 years.  It was in 1873 that the project was first conceived for the whole of Thal Doab.  The proposal to irrigate this area was repeatedly brought up for discussion in 1919, 1921, 1924, 1925, 1936 and in 1949.  But the British colonial masters repeatedly shelved the project on the pretext that it will severely hurt the water availability to lower riparian. The project proposal once again came under discussion in 1975 in a controversial way when Executive Committee of National Economic Council (ECNEC) refused to endorse the project.  Finally, on 16 August 2001, General Pervez Musharraf Retired, then Chief Executive of Pakistan, inaugurated the 30-billion rupee Greater Thal Canal (GTCc) project.

Main thrills in village

Bird hunting 
Pakistan gets a large number of guest birds from Europe, Central Asian States and India every year.  The birds from north spend winters in different wetlands and deserts of Pakistan, which are distributed almost throughout the country, from the high Himalayas to coastal mangroves and mud flats in the Indus delta.  After winter they go back to their native habitats. Because of the different lakes that emerged due to waterlogging of Jhelum link canal, the Rangpur area is a haven for these birds.  Many people locals and other hunters come for hunting.  Main birds include heron (Urdu), koot, The Siberian crane (Grus leucogeranus), Grus antigone.

Mela Baba Sedan Shah 
This Mela is a tribal festival in the memory of pious man Baba Sedan Shah in Noorpur Thal, that is celebrated by the people of Rangpur, Noorpur Thal and nearby villages.  It is held after the end of cultivation seasons of farmers and includes a fair where various handicraft items made by tribals are displayed for sale.  Cultural, musical and dance programs are also held as part of the festival.
The second biggest mela of this area is Mela Pir Shah Sakhira at Mari Shah Sakhira town some 35 km from Noorpur Thal.

Brief History of Baba Shah Bukari
Baba Sedan Shah came to the Thal area to  preach, and there were hardly any  people living around the area then. But after the arrival of Sedan Shah, many people started to live around the locality, because of his spiritual teachings.
During those times, a fatal disease started to spread around the area and most of people died. People called the Sikh family got protection in Baba's tomb and they all survived.  As soon as the fatal disease stopped there, the Sikh family celebrated that event by running camels on the first and second dates of the rainy (Sawan) month. On the same dates this mela is celebrated in Noorpur Thal, on the 15th of Sawan, to remind people every year of the end of the epidemic.

Castes

 Baghoors
 Rana-Rajpoot
 Kallu
 Titt
 Khokhar
 Bharoka
 Khohawar

 Baloch
 Kher
 Syeds
 Bhatti
 Muslim Shaikhs
 Mughal 
 Jabhana
 Awan
 Jara
 Sial
 Dhudhi-Rajpoot
 Terkhan
 Arain

Current project 

 Women are an integral part of the society, who play an important role in the development of the country, therefore education is necessary to enhance the efficiency of the women. A degree college for girls has been approved by the government of Punjab. This college will bring revolutionary change in the education sector for women.
 Understanding the importance of health, the government has appointed a medical expert in BHU for Rangpur.
 Water is a basic need of humans, so recently, for the people of the village, a water supply system has started working.

Current issues and problems 

Health is the basic problem of the city, as there is no medical laboratory or other health facilities in the hospital. Higher education is the dream of the poor people in the city. There is no higher education  institute in the city for boys. Drainage and sanitation systems are poor. Salinity is a major problem of the city, and the waste area is covered by salinity.

References 

Union councils of Khushab District
Populated places in Khushab District